Shottery, formerly a small village a mile west of Stratford-upon-Avon town centre, is now part of the town, though retaining the feeling of a distinct village.

History and amenities
Shottery has a village hall, Shottery Memorial Hall, one secondary school, Stratford Girls' Grammar School, and one small primary school, Shottery St Andrew's CofE Primary School that has been open since the mid-19th century. The school has been threatened with closure numerous times due to local spending cuts, however locals have always managed to raise the funds required to keep the school open. There is one pub (The Bell Inn), and the Santa Lucia Italian cuisine restaurant, opposite the pub, which has now closed. The latter building has long served as an eatery, and in Victorian times was a temperance movement soup kitchen. There was a Shottery Village Stores and Post Office, but it closed in the 1990s and is now a private home.

The local park, Shottery Fields, contains two football pitches and a children's play area. The Fields retain distinctive "ditch and furrow" undulations, marking medieval field systems, and these can be seen when the sun is low across the Fields. The Fields also contain a footpath to the town centre. Shottery has a Rugby Club, Shottery RFC, which is now based at Stratford Rugby Club's ground, Pearcecroft, on the Loxley Road, south Stratford. The club was founded by the Reverend David Capron, Vicar of St Andrew's church in the year 1984. 

Shottery was the childhood home of Anne Hathaway, William Shakespeare's wife, and is the location of the building known as Anne Hathaway's Cottage which is a very popular tourist destination.  The authenticity of the building as the home of Anne Hathaway is, however, not credited by Shakespearean scholars.

Governance
Shottery is presently part of the civil parish of Stratford-upon-Avon, the "Hathaway" ward of Stratford-on-Avon District Council and the "Stratford West" division of Warwickshire County Council.  The local MP (since the 2010 general election) is Nadhim Zahawi of the Conservative Party.

External links

History of Shottery

Stratford-upon-Avon
Villages in Warwickshire
William Shakespeare